Maattrraan is a 2012 Indian Tamil-language action thriller film co-written and directed by K. V. Anand and produced by Kalpathi S. Aghoram, S. Ganesh and S. Suresh under the banner AGS Entertainment. It stars Suriya in dual roles, along with Kajal Aggarwal in the female lead while Sachin Khedekar, Tara and others play supporting roles. The dialogues were penned by the duo Suresh and Balakrishnan. The film features music composed by Harris Jayaraj, cinematography handled by Soundararajan, editing done by Anthony, respectively. V. Srinivas Mohan, handled the visual effects.

The film was launched on 22 July 2011, along with the commencement of principal photography. A major portion of the film was shot in the Balkan region in countries like Croatia, Serbia, Albania and Macedonia, as well as Latvia and other parts of Europe, with rest of the scenes in India. Maattrraan was the first Indian film to use performance capture technology. Based on the Siamese twins concept, It was also touted to be the first Indian film based on conjoined twins, until two other films, with the same concept were launched later. The film was released on 12 October 2012. The film received mostly positive reviews for critics.

Plot 
Ramachandran is a geneticist who does not get due credit and funds for his research. He tries creating a human with several talents through baby designing, which leads to the birth of his sons, who are conjoined together above the waist. Since they share a common heart, doctors suggest a sacrificial surgery, to which their mother Sudha objects. They begin raising their children, Vimalan and Akilan. Vimalan and Akilan are poles apart in character, Vimalan being decent, intellectual, and good at studies; while Akhilan is happy-go-lucky, socializing, and poor at studies.

In the following years, Ramachandran makes it big with Sudha's help. His company, Locus Lacto Products, makes a huge profit through their product 'Energion', the top-selling children's powdered milk energy drink in the market. Both Vimalan and Akilan are smitten by Anjali, who joins their company as a translator. She, along with her Russian friend Volga, a journalist, spend their time with the brothers. Meanwhile, Anjali falls for Vimalan. Akilan is jealous yet feels happy for them. Volga is then revealed to be a spy who tries to steal Energion's trade secrets. She is exposed and sent out by Ramachandran. She then takes the brothers to their cattle farm under the pretext of an interview, where she takes pictures and collects a milk sample from their farm.

When Vimalan confronts Volga, she warns him that Energion is an adulterated food product and can lead to the death of thousands of children. She tells that an employ named Ajay Ratnam who joined their company was actually a spy, and because of his cheat work, he was murdered. She also exposes their father of killing their R&D department head, Raghu and setting the lab on fire, thereby destroying evidence. Consequently, she is murdered, but swallows a pen-drive containing pieces of evidence of the foul play before dying, and is thrown out of the building. Anjali acquires it from the person who performs Volga's autopsy. She hands the pen-drive over to Vimalan. Following this, Vimalan and Akilan are confronted by goons who try to get the pen-drive from him. Akilan is convinced that the attack was only meant for robbing them. During this fight, Vimalan suffers a huge blow on the head.

Vimalan is declared brain dead, and his heart is transplanted into Akilan. After the twins are separated through a surgery that results in Vimalan's total death, Akilan and Anjali are depressed. Anjali moves on and falls for Akilan. Sudha is warned that Energion is adulterated, and she confronts her husband, who asks the food safety department to raid their company. To her surprise, Energion is just declared safe and hygienic. Meanwhile, Akilan discovers that his father is behind Vimalan's and Volga's deaths by tracking his assistant Dinesh. He gets hold of the pen-drive that contains several photos, where ingredients used as cattle feed at their farm are declared as very unsafe to eat. The beginning of the scheme is traced back to the European republic of Ukraine.

Accompanied by Anjali, Akilan sets out to solve the mystery. They get her friend Ashok's help who is an official in the Indian Embassy in Ukraine, but he is killed by Dinesh, who followed them there. The photos are revealed to be athletes who were competing as Unified team under the Olympic flag in the 1992 Summer Olympics. The athletes were declared dead in a plane crash. The investigation leads them to the army medical research centre. The truth is then revealed that Energion was, in fact originally a steroid invented by Ramachandran to improve the performance of the athletes at the world games. Despite the country performing well, some athletes began suffering from similar health problems leading to their deaths, and that their death from a plane crash was faked to avoid national shame. They also learn that the adulterant in Energion could only be detected using an ionization enhancer. After being assaulted by a local mafia led by Dinesh, Akilan manages to kill him and takes the ingredients back to India.

Once they are in India, Ramachandran is exposed and is about to be arrested. Akilan requests his father to surrender but finds out that he and his brother are just a result of their father's failed experiment and that he and his brother are actually made up of several talented people's DNA. Ramachandran states that he used the whole society as his research lab through Energion. His leg is then crushed by a rock after being unsuccessful in killing his son. Akilan leaves his father to die at the hands of rats which chew on his flesh. Akilan is conferred national recognition for bravery. He later marries Anjali, and they become parents to twins.

Cast 

 Suriya in a dual role as Vimalan and Akhilan
 Kajal Aggarwal as Anjali 
 Sachin Khedekar as Ramachandran, Vimalan and Akhilan's Father and also a scientist who mix steroids in Energion milk powder and expert in Medical Crime and the main antagonist
 Tara as Sudha, Vimalan and Akhilan's Mother
 Irina Maleva as Volga
 Julia Bliss as Nadia
 Ravi Prakash as Dinesh, Ramachandran's henchmen and the secondary antagonist
 Shankar Krishnamurthy as Varadharajan
 Ajay Rathnam as Ajay Rathnam, an industralist
 Vivek as Ashok 
 Nivin as Jaganathan Raja
 Krishnamoorthy as Locus Lacto Workers Union protest leader
 Kumar Natarajan as doctor
 Isha Sharvani in item number "Theeye Theeye"
 Ajmal Ameer as Vasanthan Perumal (archive appearance from 2011 film Ko)

Production

Development 
During the post-production stage of Ko, K V Anand announced that he would direct Suriya again after the success of Ayan, further noting that it would be produced by AGS Entertainment and would begin once Suriya finished shooting for A R Murugadoss's sci-fi thriller 7aum Arivu. Anand had supposedly narrated the script of Maatraan to Suriya in 2009, but the project failed to launch then, due to the lack of technology. In an interview he stated that the film was inspired from the true story of Thailand-based Siamese twins Ying and Sang. Anand said, "I read an article about them, which inspired me to come up with a similar story. I imagined how would it be if two people, who are physically conjoined, completely differ in their ideologies". During the late production stage the title was slightly changed from Maatraan to Maattrraan.

Casting 
Several actresses were considered for the lead female role including Taapsee Pannu, Samantha Ruth Prabhu, Sonakshi Sinha and Anushka Sharma, with Kajal Aggarwal eventually grabbing the role. Kannada actress Tara was signed on to play the mother to Suriya's character. Prakash Raj was dropped from the film and was replaced by Sachin Khedekar who had played notable roles in Yaavarum Nalam and Deiva Thirumagal. Daniel Balaji was said to be a part of the cast but he denied that he was a part of the crew. Hindi actor Milind Soman was also wrongly reported to be working for the film.

Filming 
Maattrraan was officially launched on 22 July 2011 in Chennai. The first schedule was held near the Pakistan border. In November 2011, the crew filmed a song in Latvia. A major portion of the film was shot in the Balkan region in countries like Croatia, Serbia, Albania, Macedonia and especially a large chunk in Latvia. Another large portion was filmed in sets erected at Ramoji Film City in Hyderabad. In February 2012, the team left for the United States to do special facial scanning led by VFX Supervisor V Srinivas Mohan. Maattrraan thus became the first Indian film to use performance capture technology. Isha Sharvani performed an item number for a song titled 'Theeyae Theeyae' which was shot at AVM Studios. Furthermore, a duet song featuring Kajal and Suriya was shot at Wai, a village near Pune in Maharashtra. Moreover, many CG scenes were shot at Balu Mahendra studios. A song featuring over 500 junior artists and Suriya was shot in Jodhpur, touted to be the last phase of canning songs. Next, filming for an important talkie portion was held at Bhuj in Gujarat near the safe zone along the Indo-Pakistani border that lasted for five days. K V Anand and cinematographer Soundararajan subsequently were in Madagascar, hunting for a forest location to shoot a song for the film. However, since Suriya could not afford filming there due to his other commitments, Anand decided to erect a similar set in India to create the same look as in Madagascar. The shooting which was to be held in the US, was cancelled in June 2012. The entire filming was wrapped up in Norway by completing the 'Naani Koni' song in outdoor scenes shot at Trollstigen, Geiranger, Atlanterhavsveien, Måløy and Aurlandsfjorden.

Soundtrack 

Harris Jayaraj composed the soundtrack album and background score for Maattrraan, in his third collaboration within K. V. Anand. It also marks his seventh collaboration with Suriya, after Kaakha Kaakha, Ghajini, Vaaranam Aayiram, Ayan, Aadhavan and 7aum Arivu. As per Anand's idea, he and Jayaraj sailed on a ship in the Mediterranean Sea where most of the songs were roughly composed. Harris roped in Chennai-based singer-songwriter Mili Nair, who appeared in the MTV based Coke Studio, to provide vocals for the teaser theme. Mili, who had previously sung for jingles, rendered the English lyrics used in the theme, and also included in the song "Rettai Kathirae".

The soundtrack features five tracks that belong to varied genres. The album had lyrics written by Na. Muthukumar, Viveka, Pa. Vijay, Thamarai, Madhan Karky. The audio was mixed and mastered in the US. Harris Jayaraj, in May 2012, revealed that 85% of work in the film's music was complete, and later stated that the audio would be released on 23 July 2012, coinciding with Suriya's birthday. However, Anand confirmed that the album  would release in August. Later, Harris handed the master copy of the audio on 15 July 2012.

The makers announced that the audio launch of the film will take place on Singapore on 9 August 2012, which also coincided with the National Day of Singapore. The track list was released on 31 July 2012. The audio was released at the Singapore Expo in Singapore, in the presence of several noted personalities from the film industry, along with the technical crew and cast of the film. The event was witnessed around 10,000 fans. A live performance was given by Harris Jayaraj and singers Karthik, MK Balaji, Vijay Prakash, Krish and Charulatha Mani, Velmurugan, Suchitra and Sunitha Sarathy, and dance performance for the songs were done by Anjali, Neetu Chandra, Poorna, Dhanshika and Russian actress Julia Bliss, who performed in the film, and was choreographed by Brinda. The first copy of the audio CD was released by Gautham Vasudev Menon, N. Lingusamy and Hari and received it to the crew members. The event's satellite rights were secured by Jaya TV for an undisclosed price, and was premiered on 2 September 2012 at 2:30 p.m. IST.

The soundtrack received generally positive reviews from critics. IndiaGlitz wrote, "Harris Jayaraj has not disappointed, the music composer has equipped 'Maattrraan' with songs that make an instant impact", and called the album "an interesting treat to the fans". Milliblog reviewed "Maatran scrapes through Harris’ time warp!" Moviecrow reviewed "Harris and Suriya combination have always spelled success starting from Kaakha Kaakha, Ghajini, Vaaranam Aayiram, Aadhavan and 7aum Arivu. Similarly, KV Anand's association with Harris since Chellamey (as cinematographer), Ayan and Ko, elevated with great picturization, have all been chart busters. Maattrraan will further strengthen this long enviable track record of this successful commercial trio." In contrast, BehindWoods said "On screen, KV Anand's magic might do the trick but the songs as such aren't special. Most of them fall under the heard before category...", and gave it 2 out of 5 stars. Music Aloud gave 6.5 out of 10 and stated "Pretty much like their previous outing together, Harris Jayaraj produces one exceptional song for K V Anand in Maattrraan and the rest is average."

The soundtrack album of the Telugu version titled Brothers was released through Aditya Music. Initially, the audio was planned to release on 22 September 2012. But the audio release event for the film was held on 29 September 2012, at Taj Krishna Hotel in Hyderabad, with Karthi, Bellamkonda Suresh, V. V. Vinayak and Santhosh Srinivas, attending the event along with the cast and crew. The soundtrack album, unlike the Tamil version, has five tracks, reusing the same set of singers. Chandrabose and Vanamali penned the song lyrics. Indiaglitz reviewed it as "Harris Jayaraj here gets to score songs in different musical genres and he doesn't disappoint. The lead actors and the set-up of the film demanded a snazzy output, while the story needed a portrayal of emotions. Backed by a young team of lyricists and singers, Harris has dished out an interesting treat to the fans."

Release 
Later, the makers announced that the film will be released on 19 September 2012, which coincides the festival of Ganesh Chathurthi. However, the film's production company, AGS Entertainment confirmed that the film will be released on 12 October 2012. The film was dubbed in Telugu as Brothers, with Karthi providing voiceover for Suriya's character in the film.

Maattrraan was touted to become Suriya's biggest release till date, which was released over 1,400 prints. The film opened in over 1,200 screens worldwide on the release date. In France, the film was released by Aanaa Films in 14 different screens across the country. In the US, ATMUS Entertainment distributed the film in 63 centers, making it the widest release of a Tamil film in the country. The film was censored on 3 October 2012 and it was given a U certificate by the Censor Board without cuts.  This film was dubbed in Telugu as Brothers and in Hindi as No 1 Judwaa – The Unbreakable in 2014.

Marketing 

The first poster of the film was released on early November 2011. The film's first teaser was released on 11 July 2012. The second teaser of the film was released on 9 August 2012, during the film's audio launch. The VFX making of the film was released on 18 September 2012. The third teaser of the film was premiered on Jaya TV on 3 October 2012, and was simultaneously uploaded on YouTube.

Reception

Critical reception 
The Times of India gave the film 3.5 out of 5 stars, commenting that it had a "running time of close to three hours, and editor Anthony should have persevered with the director to reduce it as a lot of time is expended on scenes that could have been easily sacrificed to make it a much more compact package. Or maybe Anand also needed a Maattrraan (alternate) to step in when he lost his way". IndiaGlitz rated it 3.5 out of 5 stars, saying that it was "worth a watch for Suriya's acting and some great groundwork done by K. V. Anand", further adding that "the second half does a shabby job of wrapping things up, but it still gives you an  unique experience overall". Sify's critic commented: "If you are looking at a time pass entertainer, walk into K. V. Anand’s Maattrraan. It is a fun ride till interval and in the second half there is a neat message told with lot of cinematic liberties. Suriya holds the film together as the script tends to waver towards the climax". BehindWoods.com gave it 3 out of 5 stars, while stating: "There is a pattern in K. V. Anand’s films. There is a definite social message which he masquerades with commercial components and packages it interestingly. Maattrraan also follows the route and it delivers what it promises- a rich and stylish entertainer with an interesting story". Oneindia rated the film 3 out of 5 stars, stating that it had "rare characters of conjoined twins but has a predictable story and appears like a second part of Suriya's last movie 7aum Arivu directed by A. R. Murugadoss" and that it was "good, not brilliant". Pavithra Srinivasan of Rediff gave the film 2.5 out of 5 stars, concluding that it had a "great premise, great characters and actors who could have pulled off a complicated story. Sadly, the movie never capitalises on its strengths". S Viswanath from Deccan Herald cited that "despite its interesting theme, the film is, however, done in by its rather long running time as also painfully sluggish first half seeking to establish the plot but brimming with comic capers", summing up that it was "an ensemble entertainer but could have been much better". Haricharan Pudipeddi of NowRunning gave the film 2.5/5 stars, stating that it "only promises the potential of Suriya, but fails to arouse interest due to its stretched second half and lacklustre narration". The New Indian Express critic Malini Mannath claimed that the film "with its whimsical screenplay and lackadaisical narration, turns out to be a huge disappointment", going on to add that it "smacks of overconfidence, and an utter disregard for the sense and sensibility of a viewer". J Hurtado of Twitch Film said, "Maatraan is two decent films split down the middle with little connective tissue to bind them, not unlike its protagonists" and concluded, "See it at your own risk".

In response to most of the reviews which mainly criticised the "film being very long and dragging towards the climax", Maattrraan was re-edited to make itself "more slick and racy, to appeal to a larger section of the audience". 1 minute and 23 seconds of the first half and 19 minutes and 30 seconds of the second half were trimmed from the film. The trimmed version earned a favourable response from fans, who called it "more racy and entertaining".

 Box office 
The film also collected  in Kerala in the opening weekend. The film stayed in the first position for three consecutive weeks in Chennai but was later overtaken by horror film Pizza at the box office. The film was declared as an 'Above average' by Behindwoods. The film is reported to have completed a 50-day run in a few theatres across Tamil Nadu.

The film also collected US$1,124,812 from Malaysia box office.

 Awards and nominations Other awards'''

 EME (Excellence in Media & Entertainment) award for the Best VFX in an Indian feature film category for 2012, recognised as the highest honour for Visual Effect works.
 Special Jury Award for Best VFX at the 10th Edition of BAF Awards.

 Controversies 
When Maattrraan was touted to be the first Indian film based on conjoined twins, it created a stir after two other films with the same concept – Chaarulatha and Iruvan, were launched later. It was reported to have shared the same storyline as Charulatha, but director K V Anand however denied the reports and said, "After reading such reports, I watched the original version (Charulatha was based on 2007 Thai movie Alone). There isn’t any connection between the two movies, except for the fact that the protagonists are conjoined twins."

Later reports claimed that the film was inspired by another conjoined twins-themed American film Stuck on You, with the posters of both films also being described as similar to each other. Lead actor Suriya however denied this and said, "I have been seeing comments and links on social networking sites saying that Maattrraan is based on some world movie. Only after seeing those links, I came to know that such a film even exists!"

The film was banned in the state of Karnataka due to tension between Karnataka and Tamil Nadu over the Kaveri River water dispute.

 Legacy 
Vivek and Cell Murugan play conjoined twins in Killadi'' (2015) inspired by Akhilan and Vimalan from the film. The song "Rettai Kathirae" is reused.

An internet meme began trending on social media platforms in late May 2020, in which Suriya's films were coincided with real life incidents, that happened around the world. Here, Russia's ban in 2018 Winter Olympics, was predicted in the film.

References

External links 
 

2010s Tamil-language films
2012 action thriller films
2012 films
Fictional conjoined twins
Films about twin brothers
Films scored by Harris Jayaraj
Films shot in Croatia
Films shot in Gujarat
Films shot in Latvia
Films shot in Norway
Films shot in Serbia
Indian action thriller films
Medical-themed films
Twins in Indian films
Films directed by K. V. Anand